The 2006–07 Weber State Wildcats men's basketball team represented Weber State University during the 2006–07 NCAA Division I men's basketball season. The Wildcats were led by first-year head coach Randy Rahe and played their home games at the Dee Events Center. They were members of the Big Sky Conference. They finished the season 20–12, 11–5 in Big Sky play to win the Big Sky regular season championship. They were also champions of the Big Sky Conference tournament to earn an automatic bid to the NCAA tournament where they lost in the opening round to eventual Final Four participant UCLA.

Roster

Schedule and results

|-
!colspan=9 style=| Regular season

|-
!colspan=9 style=| Big Sky tournament

|-
!colspan=9 style=| NCAA tournament

Awards and honors
David Patten – Big Sky Player of the Year, AP Honorable Mention All-American

References

Weber State Wildcats men's basketball seasons
Weber State
Weber State
Weber State Wildcats men's basketball
Weber State Wildcats men's basketball